Ivania may refer to:
 Ivania (beetle), a genus of beetles in the family Melandryidae
 Ivania (plant), a genus of plants in the family Brassicaceae
 Ivania (opera), by Emilio Pizzi, 1926